Gerald Fitzgerald may refer to:

 Gerald Fitzgerald, Lord of Offaly (died 1204)
 Gerald FitzGerald, 5th Duke of Leinster (1851–1893), Irish peer
 Gerald FitzGerald, 8th Duke of Leinster (1914–2004), Irish peer
 Gerald FitzGerald, 3rd Earl of Desmond (1335–1398)
 Gerald FitzGerald, 14th Earl of Desmond (c. 1533–1583), leader of the Irish rebellion of 1579
 Gerald FitzGerald, 5th Earl of Kildare (died 1432), Irish peer
 Gerald FitzGerald, 8th Earl of Kildare (c. 1456–1513)
 Gerald FitzGerald, 9th Earl of Kildare (1487–1534)
 Gerald FitzGerald, 11th Earl of Kildare (1525–1585)
 Gerald FitzGerald, 14th Earl of Kildare (died 1612), Irish peer
 Gerald FitzGerald, 15th Earl of Kildare (1611–1620)
 Gerald Fitzgerald, 3rd Lord Decies (died 1553)
 Gerald Fitzgerald (artist) (1873–1935), Australian watercolourist
 Gerald Fitzgerald (priest) (1894–1969), American clergyman
 Gerald FitzGerald, (1821–1886), son of the Duke of Leinster
Gerald F. Fitzgerald, (1925–2010), American banking magnate
 Tony Fitzgerald (Gerald Edward Fitzgerald, born 1941), Australian judge

See also
 Gerard George Fitzgerald (1834–1904), New Zealand politician, in some sources misspelled as Gerald Fitzgerald
 Garret FitzGerald (disambiguation), alternative anglicisation of the same Irish name